The 2017 Icelandic Men's Football League Cup was the 22nd season of the Icelandic Men's League Cup, a pre-season professional football competition in Iceland. The tournament involves twenty-four clubs from the top two leagues in Iceland, Úrvalsdeild karla and 1. deild karla, and uses a combination of group and knockout rounds to determine which team is the winner of the tournament. 

The tournament began on 17 February and concluded with the final on 17 April 2017. KR were champions of the tournament.

Participating teams

Úrvalsdeild

 Breiðablik
 FH
 Fjölnir
 Grindavík
 ÍA
 ÍBV
 KA
 KR
 Stjarnan
 Valur
 Víkingur
 Víkingur Ólafsvík

1. deild karla

 Fram
 Fylkir
 Grótta
 Haukar
 HK
 ÍR
 Keflavík
 Leiknir F.
 Leiknir R.
 Selfoss
 Þróttur R.
 Þór

League tables

Group 1

Group 2

Group 3

Valur decided not to participate in the knockout stages

Group 4

Knockout stage

Quarter-finals
The top two teams of each group entered the quarter-finals stage. Valur, who finished 1st in Group 2, withdrew from the tournament after the group stages. Þór, who finished 3rd in Group 2, replaced Valur in the knockout stages.

Semi-finals
The semi-final matches were played on 13 April 2017.

Final
The final was played on 17 April 2017.

Top goalscorers

References

External links
Soccerway

2017 domestic association football cups
2017 in Icelandic football
Icelandic Men's Football League Cup